Chand Aur Suraj is a 1965 Indian Hindi-language film produced by Ganga Chitra and directed by Dulal Guha. The film stars Dharmendra, Ashok Kumar, Tanuja, Nirupa Roy and Asit Sen. The film's music is by Salil Chowdhury. The film was remade in Tamil as Annavin Aasai (1966).

Plot 
After a disgraced man's accidental death, the lives of his family change drastically when they receive money from his insurance company.

Cast 
 Dharmendra
 Ashok Kumar
 Tanuja
 Nirupa Roy
 Asit Sen

Soundtrack 
The soundtrack was composed by Salil Chowdhury. The song "Baug Mein Kali Khili" was later adapted by him into the Malayalam song "Puthan Valakkare" in Chemmeen (1966).
"Baag Mein Kali Khili" – Asha Bhosle
"Jhanan Jhanan" – Lata Mangeshkar
"Kisine Jaadu Kiya" – Mukesh
"Meri Aur Unke Preet Puranini" – Asha Bhosle
"Teri Yaad" – Lata Mangeshkar
"Tumhe Dil Se Chaha" – Mohammed Rafi & Suman Kalyanpur

References

External links 
 

1965 films
1960s Hindi-language films
Films scored by Salil Chowdhury
Hindi films remade in other languages
Films about fraud